Chris "Zip" Rzeppa (born January 8, 1952) is an American former broadcaster.

Early life and career
He attended Brother Rice High School in Metro Detroit, where he played football and basketball. After high school, he attended Boston University, where he earned a degree in journalism and was a member of the basketball team. At Boston University, he was a classmate of both Howard Stern and Bill O’Reilly.

After college, Rzeppa began his professional broadcasting career announcing Boston University football and hockey games. He worked at WANE-TV in Fort Wayne, IN and then at WNEM-TV in Saginaw, MI. His next stop was WLWT-TV in Cincinnati, OH, where he recorded 'The Ballad of the Bengals', a local hit song celebrating the Cincinnati Bengals. He then went to WNEV-TV (now WHDH-TV) in Boston, MA, where he was reunited with Bill O'Reilly, who had recently been hired as a news anchor.

St. Louis
After leaving WNEV-TV, Rzeppa was hired by KTVI-TV in St. Louis, MO, where he became popular for his Friday night Zippo Awards for "The best, the worst, and the weirdest performances in the wild and wacky wonderful world of sports." AT KTVI-TV, a years-long rift began with Whitey Herzog, after the Cardinals manager thought Rzeppa was trying to get him fired. Still, his Q rating remained among the highest in the country. After Rzeppa moved to KMOV-TV in St. Louis, his interns included future well-known broadcaster Joe Buck. He also started 'Sunday Nights with Bernie', a segment featuring NHL Hall of Famer Bernie Federko. In total, Rzeppa anchored more than 8,000 local TV sportscasts. In 2014, the St. Louis Media History Foundation inducted Rzeppa into its Media Hall of Fame.

Rzeppa was also the founder of Radio Personalities, Inc., which syndicated radio programs, including Talkin' Roundball with Dick Vitale, Offsides with Dan Dierdorf, and The Great American Sports Trivia Show.

Charity and faith
After leaving broadcasting, Rzeppa entered the not-for-profit world. He worked for MERS/Goodwill Industries (1996-2003), the St. Louis Council of the Society of St. Vincent de Paul (2006-2011), and Angels’ Arms (2011-2012). He is the Founder and current Executive Director of Mater Media, a Catholic apostolate devoted to evangelizing the Catholic faith through book publishing, events, fundraising, and speaking engagements. He is the author of two books, ‘My Rock & Salvation’ (2014), a novel for teens, and ‘For A Greater Purpose: My Life Journey’ (2015), an autobiography.

References

1952 births
21st-century American novelists
American Roman Catholics
American television sports announcers
Boston University College of Communication alumni
Living people
Sports Emmy Award winners
People from St. Louis
21st-century American male writers
21st-century American non-fiction writers
American male non-fiction writers